Rosa Maria Luísa Gala (born April 17, 1995) is an Angolan female basketball player.

Born in Lubango, Gala was selected to play for the Angola women's national basketball team that won bronze at the 2011 FIBA Africa Under-16 Championship. the following year she was selected for the 2012 FIBA Africa Under-18 Championship. She was selected for the Angola women's national basketball team's pre-squad for the 2013 Afrobasket but was later dismissed for failing to meet age requirements.

Gala's club side, C.D. Primeiro de Agosto, came second in the 2013 FIBA Africa Women's Clubs Champions Cup. She again represented Angola in basketball at the 2014 Lusophony Games, winning silver. She also played for Angola at the 2014 FIBA World Championship for Women and in basketball at the 2015 African Games – Women's tournament.

References

1995 births
Living people
Angolan women's basketball players
C.D. Primeiro de Agosto women's basketball players
Small forwards
African Games bronze medalists for Angola
African Games medalists in basketball
Competitors at the 2015 African Games
People from Lubango